SS Richard Bland was a Liberty ship built in the United States during World War II. She was named after Richard Bland, an American planter and statesman from Virginia. He served for many terms in the House of Burgesses, was a delegate to the Continental Congress in 1774 and 1775, and is considered a Founding Father of the United States.

Construction
Richard Bland was laid down on 29 October 1941, under a Maritime Commission (MARCOM) contract, MCE hull 28, by the Bethlehem-Fairfield Shipyard, Baltimore, Maryland; and was launched on 28 February 1942.

History
She was allocated to American South African Lines, Inc., on 17 April 1942.

Sinking
The merchant ship  was sunk while one of the torpedo struck Richard Bland on the starboard side at hold #1, passing through without exploding. This created two  holes on either side of the ship causing the deck to crack and the collision bulkhead to rupture. The forepeak tank flooded and the ship to begin to list to starboard, but she remained in the convoy at only a slightly reduced speed. On the night of 6 March, she was forced from the convoy because of gale-force winds and rough seas. She then proceeded by herself to Iceland. At 16:36, on 10 March, U-255 once again fired a spread of three torpedoes at Richard Bland with only one sticking her on her port side at the fireroom. This caused the #4 and #5 holds to flood and the ship soon broke in two just forward of the bridge. The captain, Lawrence Dodd, ordered four crewmen into each of two lifeboats to be launched, but not released, until the abandon ship order was given. When attempting to pass the boats to the other side of Richard Bland the ropes broke and they drifted astern. U-255 fired another spread at 16:56, but missed. The rest of the crew of nine officers, 32 crewmen and 28 Armed guards were forced to abandon ship in the two remaining lifeboats. Due to the boats being overcrowded and rough seas, men that had to cling to the sides of the boats lost strength and drowned, while the boat that the captain was on was believed to have been swamped and not seen again.

 was able to pick up 27 survivors in the remaining lifeboat on 11 March, with the two lifeboats, containing 4 crewmen each, being picked up later in the morning. The captain, along with five officers, 13 crewmen, and 15 Armed guards were lost. The forward section was later taken in tow and brought to Akureyri, Iceland, where she was declared a Constructive Total Loss.

References

Bibliography

 
 
 
 
 

 

Liberty ships
Ships built in Baltimore
1942 ships
Ships sunk by German submarines in World War II
Ships named for Founding Fathers of the United States